Perry Lake Water Aerodrome, formerly , was located  east of Perry Lake, Ontario Canada.

References

Defunct seaplane bases in Ontario